A quotative (abbreviated ) is a grammatical device to mark quoted speech in some languages, and as such it preserves the grammatical person and tense of the original utterance rather than adjusting it as would be the case with reported speech. It can be equated with "spoken quotation marks".

Dutch
In Dutch, the preposition van can be used to introduce direct speech:
Ik zei er van Japie sta stil (a line from a children's song).
I said, 'Japie [colloquial diminutive of Jaap], stand still.'
Quotative van can be used in combination with a verb of speech, as in the above example, a noun designating something with message-carrying content, or a light verb, e.g. a copula (like for English quotative like).

In the specific colloquial combination zoiets hebben van (literally, "have something suchlike of"), the subsequent quoted speech conveys a (possibly unspoken) feeling:
De ouders hadden zoiets van laten we het maar proberen, wie weet lukt het.
The parents were like, let's try it, who knows it will work.

English

In English colloquial speech, forms of the verb be like are used as a quotative:
He was like, 'You'll love it.'  And I was like, 'You can't be serious!
In speech, the word like in this use is typically followed by a brief pause, indicated here with a comma. This quotative construction is particularly common for introducing direct speech indicating someone's attitude.

Georgian
Georgian marks quoted speech with one of two suffixes depending on the grammatical person of who made the original utterance, -მეთქი for the first person and -ო for the second and third person.

The following sentences show the use of the first person and non-first person quotative particles respectively. Note the preservation of both the person and tense of the original utterances:

First person quotative
{|class="wikitable"
|მოხუცმა ||იტირა, ||როცა ||ვუთხარი, ||რომ ||თქვენი ||ვაჟიშვილი ||ჯარში ||უნდა ||წავიდეს||-მეთქი.
|-
|Mokhutsma||it'ira||rotsa||vutkhari||rom||tkveni||vazhishvili||jar-shi||unda||ts'avides||metki.
|-
|He-ERG||cry-AOR||when||I told-AOR him||that||your||son-NOM||in the army||must||he goes-OPT||1st person quot.
|-
|colspan=11|"The old man cried when I told him that his son had to enter the army" lit. "that 'your son has to enter the army."
|}

Second and third person quotative
{|class="wikitable"
|კახეთში ||კი ||ინტურისტის ||ექსკურსიას ||უნდა ||გაყვე||ო.
|-
|K'akhet-shi||k'i||int'urist'is||eksk'ursias||unda||gaqve||o.
|-
|To Kakheti||but||Intourist-GEN||excursion-DAT||must||you accompany-OPT it||3rd person quot.
|-
|colspan=7|"But (they said) that I had to accompany an Intourist excursion to Kakheti" lit. "that 'you must accompany"
|}

Note that this second sentence omits an overt verbum dicendi since the original speaker is already known, and context makes it clear that the speaker was the original addressee.

Ancient Greek
Ancient Greek can mark quoted speech in prose with the subordinating conjunction ὅτι:

Japanese
In Japanese, the quotative と [to] is used to indicate direct speech in this sentence:

{|class="wikitable"
|石田さん    ||は     ||「トマトが好きじゃない」    ||と    ||言いました。
|-
|Ishida-san||wa||"tomato ga suki janai"||to||iimashita.
|-
|Mr. Ishida||top.||"tomato-nom. like-neg." ||quot.||say-past-polite
|-
|colspan=5|"Mr. Ishida said that he didn't like tomatoes" lit. "that 'I don't like tomatoes"
|}

The following example shows the preservation of both grammatical person and the tense in a quoted utterance using the quotative particle:

{|class="wikitable"
|彼女||は||僕||に||「あなたが好きだ」||と||言った。
|-
|Kanojo||wa||boku||ni||"anata ga suki da"||to||itta.
|-
|She||top.||I||dat.||"you-nom. like cop." ||quot.||say-past
|-
|colspan=7|"She told me that she liked me" lit. "that 'I like you"
|}

See Japanese grammar for more examples of when と (to) is used.

 Korean 

In Korean, the marker  rago follows the quoted sentence clause, marking direct quotation as follows:

{|class="wikitable"
|주현 씨||는||저||에게||"니가 좋아"||라고||말했어요.
|-
|Joohyun sshi||neun||jeo||ege||"niga joha"||rago||malhaesseoyo.
|-
|Ms. Joohyun||top.||I||dat.||"you-nom. like"||quot.||say-past-polite
|-
|colspan=7|"Joohyun told me that she liked me." lit. "that 'I like you."
|}

The verb  malhada, "to say", is often shortened to  hada, meaning "to do". This is because the quotative marker alone makes it obvious the quote was said by someone, so saying the whole verb is redundant.

Indirect quotation works similarly, albeit using different markers. When quoting a plain sentence, the marker  n/neundago ( ndago after vowels,  neundago after consonants) is attached to the quoted verb. When quoting adjectives,  dago is used:

When quoting the copula  ida, the marker  rago is used instead:

Question sentences are marked with the quotative marker  nyago, which changes to  neunyago after verbs ending in a consonant and to  eunyago after adjectives ending in a consonant.

Sanskrit
In Sanskrit, the quotative marker iti is used to convey the meaning of someone (or something) having said something. 

Sinhala 
In the following English sentence, no word indicates the quoted speech.

John said, "Wow,"

That is indicated only typographically. In Sinhala, on the other hand, here is the equivalent sentence:

John Wow kiyalaa kivvaa

It has an overt indication of quoted speech after the quoted string Wow, the quotative kiyalaa.

 Telugu 
In Telugu, traditionally the words andi (for female and neuter singular), meaning she said that or it said, annāḍu (for male singular), meaning he said that and annāru''' (for plural), meaning They said are used as quotative markers. However, in recent times, many Telugu speakers are resorting to use the Latin quotation marks ("...") to convey speech.

For Example, 
 తను ఇంటికి వెళదాము అన్నాడు  (tanu iṃṭiki veḻadāmu annāḍu)
means, He said that we will go to home, literally, He Said, "We'll go home".

 Turkish 
In Turkish, direct speech is marked by following it by a form of the verb demek ("to say"), as inHastayım' dedi.'I am ill', he said.
In particular, the word diye (literally "saying"), a participle of demek, is used to mark quoted speech when another verb of utterance than demek is needed:Hastayım mı?' diye sordu.'Am I ill?', he asked.
In contrast, indirect speech uses the opposite order. The reported utterance is preceded by the verb of utterance and introduced by the conjunctive particle ki, comparable to English "that":Dedi ki hastaydı.''
He said that he was ill.

See also 
 Verbum dicendi
 Quoted speech
 Reported speech

References

Parts of speech